The 2015–16 Boston University Terriers women's basketball team represented Boston University during the 2015–16 NCAA Division I women's basketball season. The Terries, led by second year head coach Katy Steding, played their home games at Case Gym and are members of the Patriot League. They finished the season 3–27, 3–15 in Patriot League play to finish in last place. They lost in the first round of the Patriot League women's tournament to American.

Roster

Schedule

|-
!colspan=9 style="background:#CC0000; color:#FFFFFF;"| Non-conference regular season

|-
!colspan=9 style="background:#CC0000; color:#FFFFFF;"| Patriot League regular season

|-
!colspan=9 style="background:#CC0000; color:#FFFFFF;"| Patriot League Women's Tournament

See also
2015–16 Boston University Terriers men's basketball team

References

Boston University
Boston University Terriers women's basketball seasons
Boston University Terriers women's basketball
Boston University Terriers women's basketball